Augustus Saint-Gaudens (March 1, 1848 – August 3, 1907) was an American sculptor of the Beaux-Arts generation who embodied the ideals of the American Renaissance. From a French-Irish family, Saint-Gaudens was raised in New York City.  He traveled to Europe for further training and artistic study. After he returned to New York, he achieved major critical success for his monuments commemorating heroes of the American Civil War, many of which still stand. Saint-Gaudens created works such as the Robert Gould Shaw Memorial on Boston Common, Abraham Lincoln: The Man, and grand equestrian monuments to Civil War generals: General John Logan Memorial in Chicago's Grant Park and William Tecumseh Sherman at the corner of New York's Central Park.  In addition, he created the popular historicist representation of The Puritan.

Saint-Gaudens also created Classical works such as the Diana, and employed his design skills in numismatics. He designed the $20 Saint Gaudens Double Eagle gold piece (1905–1907) for the US Mint, considered one of the most beautiful American coins ever issued, as well as the $10 "Indian Head" gold eagle; both of these were minted from 1907 until 1933. In his later years he founded the "Cornish Colony", an artist's colony in New Hampshire that included notable painters, sculptors, writers, and architects. His brother Louis Saint-Gaudens, with whom he occasionally collaborated, was also a well-known sculptor.

Early life and career
Saint-Gaudens was born in Dublin, Ireland, to an Irish mother and French father, Bernard Paul Ernest Saint-Gaudens, a shoemaker by trade from a small village in the French Pyrenees, Aspet, 15 kilometers from Saint-Gaudens. After his parents immigrated to America when he was six months of age, he was reared in New York City.

In 1861, he became an apprentice to a cameo-cutter, Louis Avet, and took evening art classes at the Cooper Union in New York City. Two years later, he was hired as an apprentice of Jules Le Brethon, another cameo cutter, and enrolled at the National Academy of Design. At age 19, his apprenticeship was completed and he traveled to Paris in 1867, where he studied in the atelier of François Jouffroy at the École des Beaux-Arts.

In 1870, he left Paris for Rome to study art and architecture, and worked on his first commissions. There he met a deaf American art student, Augusta Fisher Homer, whom he married on June 1, 1877. The couple had one child, a son named Homer Saint-Gaudens.

In 1874, Edwards Pierrepont, a prominent New York reformer, hired Saint-Gaudens to create a marble bust of himself. Pierrepont, a phrenologist, proved to be a demanding client, insisting that Saint-Gaudens make his head larger. Saint-Gaudens said that Pierrepont's bust "seemed to be affected with some dreadful swelling disease" and he later told a friend that he would "give anything to get hold of that bust and smash it to atoms".

In 1876, he won a commission for a bronze David Farragut Memorial. He rented a studio at 49 rue Notre Dame des Champs. Stanford White designed the pedestal. It was unveiled on May 25, 1881, in Madison Square Park. He collaborated with Stanford White again in 1892–94 when he created Diana as a weather vane for the second Madison Square Garden building in New York City; a second version used is now in the collection of the Philadelphia Museum of Art, with several reduced versions in museums including the Metropolitan Museum of Art in New York City. The statue stood on a 300-foot-high tower, making Diana the highest point in the city. It was also the first statue in that part of Manhattan to be lit at night by electricity. The statue and its tower was a landmark until 1925 when the building was demolished.

In New York, he was a member of the Tilers, a group of prominent artists and writers, including Winslow Homer (his wife's fourth cousin), William Merritt Chase and Arthur Quartley. He was also a member of The Lambs, Salmagundi Club and The National Arts Club in New York City.

Civil War commemorative commissions

In 1876, Saint-Gaudens received his first major commission: a monument to Civil War Admiral David Farragut, in New York's Madison Square; his friend Stanford White designed an architectural setting for it, and when it was unveiled in 1881, its naturalism, its lack of bombast and its siting combined to make it a tremendous success, and Saint-Gaudens' reputation was established.

The commissions followed fast, including the colossal Abraham Lincoln: The Man in Lincoln Park, Chicago in a setting by architect White, 1884–1887, considered the finest portrait statue in the United States (a replica was placed at Lincoln's tomb in Springfield, Illinois, and another stands in Parliament Square, London).  The statue was highly influential for American artists and received widespread praise by critics.

A long series of memorials, funerary monuments and busts, including the Adams Memorial, the Peter Cooper Monument at Cooper Square, and the John A. Logan Monument. Arguably the greatest of these monuments is the bronze bas-relief that forms the Robert Gould Shaw Memorial on Boston Common, 1884–1897, which Saint-Gaudens labored on for 14 years; even after the public version had been unveiled, he continued with further versions. Two grand equestrian monuments to Civil War generals are outstanding: to General John A. Logan, atop a tumulus in Chicago, 1894–1897, and to William Tecumseh Sherman at the corner of Central Park in New York (with the African-American model Hettie Anderson posing as an allegorical Victory), 1892–1903, the first use of Robert Treat Paine's pointing device for the accurate mechanical enlargement of sculpture models. The depictions of the African-American soldiers on the Shaw memorial is noted as a rare example of true-to-life, non-derogatory, depictions of African physical characteristics in 19th-century American art.

For the Lincoln Centennial of 1909, Saint-Gaudens produced another statue of the president. A seated figure, Abraham Lincoln: The Head of State, is in Chicago's Grant Park. Saint-Gaudens completed the design work and had begun casting the statue at the time of his death—his workshop completed it. The statue's head was used as the model for the commemorative postage stamp issued on the 100th anniversary of Lincoln's birth.

Other works

Saint-Gaudens also created the statue for the monument of Charles Stewart Parnell, which was installed at the north end of Dublin's O'Connell Street in 1911.

In 1887, when Robert Louis Stevenson made his second trip to the United States, Saint-Gaudens had the opportunity to make the preliminary sketches for a five-year project of a medallion depicting Stevenson, in very poor health at the time, propped in bed writing. With minor modifications, this medallion was reproduced for the Stevenson memorial in St. Giles' Cathedral, Edinburgh. Stevenson's cousin and biographer, Graham Balfour, deemed the work "the most satisfactory of all the portraits of Stevenson". Balfour also noted that Saint-Gaudens greatly admired Stevenson and had once said he would "gladly go a thousand miles for the sake of a sitting" with him.[2]

Saint-Gaudens was also commissioned by a variety of groups to create medals including varied commemorative themes like The Women"s Auxiliary of the Massachusetts Civil Service Reform Association Presentation Medal and the World's Columbian Exposition Medal. Such pieces stand testament to both his broad appeal and the respect that was given to him by his contemporaries.

A statue of philanthropist Robert Randall stands in the gardens of Sailors' Snug Harbor in New York. A statue of copper king Marcus Daly is at the entrance of the Montana School of Mines on the west end of Park St. in Butte, Montana. A statue of former United States Congressman and New York Governor Roswell Pettibone Flower was dedicated in 1902 in Watertown, New York.

Teacher and advisor

Saint-Gaudens' prominence brought him students, and he was an able and sensitive teacher. He tutored young artists privately, taught at the Art Students League of New York, and took on a large number of assistants. He was an artistic advisor to the World's Columbian Exposition of 1893, an avid supporter of the American Academy in Rome, and part of the McMillan Commission, which brought into being L'Enfant's long-ignored master plan for the nation's capital.

Through his career Augustus Saint-Gaudens made a specialty of intimate private portrait panels in sensitive, very low relief, which owed something to the Florentine Renaissance. It was felt he heavily influenced another Irish American sculptor, Jerome Connor.

Over the course of his long career Saint-Gaudens employed, and by doing so, trained, some of the next generation's finest sculptors. These included James Earle Fraser, Frances Grimes, Henry Hering, Charles Keck, Mary Lawrence, Frederick MacMonnies, Philip Martiny, Helen Mears, Robert Paine, Alexander Phimister Proctor, Louis Saint-Gaudens, Elsie Ward and Adolph Alexander Weinman.

New York City's PS40 is named after Saint-Gaudens.

Coinage

Saint-Gaudens referred to his early relief portraits as "medallions" and took a great interest in the art of the coin: his $20 gold piece, the double eagle coin he designed for the US Mint, 1905–1907, though it was adapted for minting, is still considered one of the most beautiful American coins ever issued.

Chosen by Theodore Roosevelt to redesign the coinage of the nation at the beginning of the 20th century, Saint-Gaudens produced an ultra high-relief $20 gold piece that was adapted into a flattened-down version by the United States Mint. The ultra high-relief coin took up to 11 strikes to bring up the details, and only 20 or so of these coins were minted in 1907. The Ultra High Reliefs did not stack properly and were deemed unfit for commerce. They are highly sought-after today; one sold in a 2005 auction for $2,990,000. The coin was then adapted into the High relief version, which, although requiring eight fewer strikes than the Ultra High Relief coins, was still deemed impractical for commerce. 12,317 of these were minted, and are currently among the most in-demand U.S. coins. The coin was finally modified to a normal-relief version, which was minted from 1907 to 1933. This design (an "ultra-high relief" $20) was successfully minted in 24 karat gold; 115,178 coins were produced. This coin was issued by the U.S. Mint in 2009.

Later life and the Cornish Colony

Diagnosed with cancer in 1900, Saint-Gaudens decided to live at his Federal house with barn-studio set in the handsome gardens he had made, where he and his family had been spending summers since 1885, in Cornish, New Hampshire – though not in retirement. Despite waning energy, he continued to work, producing a steady stream of reliefs and public sculpture. In 1901, he was appointed a member of the Senate Park, or McMillan, Commission for the redesign of Washington, D.C.'s Mall and its larger park system, along with architects Daniel Burnham and Charles Follen McKim, and landscape architect Frederick Law Olmsted, Jr.; in 1902, the Commission published their report, popularly known as the McMillan Plan. In 1904, he was one of the first seven chosen for membership in the American Academy of Arts and Letters. That same year the large studio burned, with the irreplaceable loss of the sculptor's correspondence, his sketchbooks, and many works in progress.

The Cornish Art Colony Saint-Gaudens and his brother Louis attracted made for a dynamic social and creative environment. The most famous included painters Maxfield Parrish and Kenyon Cox, architect and garden designer Charles A. Platt, and sculptor Paul Manship. Included were painters Thomas Dewing, George de Forest Brush, dramatist Percy MacKaye, the American novelist Winston Churchill, and the sculptor Louis St. Gaudens, Augustus's brother. After his death in 1907, it slowly dissipated. His house and gardens are now preserved as the Saint-Gaudens National Historic Site.

Saint-Gaudens was elected a member of the American Academy of Arts and Sciences in 1896. In 1901, the French government made him an Officier de la Légion d'honneur. In 1920, Saint-Gaudens was posthumously elected to the Hall of Fame for Great Americans. In 1940, his image appeared on a U.S. postage stamp in the "Famous Americans" series.

Saint-Gaudens and his wife figure prominently in the 2011 book The Greater Journey: Americans in Paris by historian David McCullough. In interviews upon the book's release, McCullough said the letters of Augusta Saint-Gaudens to her friends and family in the United States were among the richest primary sources he discovered in years of research into the lives of the American community in Paris in the late 19th century.

Legacy and honors
During World War II the Liberty ship  was built in Panama City, Florida, and named in his honor.

In 1940, the U.S. Post Office issued a series of 35 postage stamps, 'The Famous American Series' honoring America's famous artists, poets, educators, authors, scientists, composers and inventors. The renowned sculptor Augustus Saint-Gaudens was among those chosen for the 'Artists' category of this series and appears on this stamp, which was first issued in New York City on September 16, 1940.

New York City's PS40 is named after Saint-Gaudens.

Among the public collections holding works by Augustus Saint-Gaudens are:

Addison Gallery of American Art (Andover, Massachusetts)
Amon Carter Museum (Texas)
Art Institute of Chicago (Chicago, IL)
Berkshire Museum (Pittsfield, Massachusetts)
Brigham Young University Museum of Art (Utah)
Brooklyn Museum of Art (New York City)
Carnegie Museum of Art (Pittsburgh, Pennsylvania)
Cincinnati Art Museum
Courtauld Institute of Art (London)
Currier Museum of Art (New Hampshire)
Delaware Art Museum
Detroit Institute of Arts

Honolulu Museum of Art
Lincoln Park Conservatory (Chicago, IL)
Los Angeles County Museum of Art
Mabee-Gerrer Museum of Art, (Shawnee, OK)
Mead Art Museum (Amherst College, Massachusetts)
Memorial Art Gallery of the University of Rochester (New York)
Metropolitan Museum of Art, (New York City)
Museum of the Rhode Island School of Design
Montclair Art Museum (New Jersey)
Musée d'Orsay (Paris)
Museum of Fine Arts, Boston
National Academy of Design (New York City)

National Gallery of Art (Washington, D.C.)
National Portrait Gallery (London)
North Carolina Museum of Art
Saint-Gaudens National Historic Site (New Hampshire)
Newark Museum (New Jersey)
Pennsylvania Academy of the Fine Arts
Philadelphia Museum of Art
Sheldon Memorial Art Gallery (Lincoln, Nebraska)
Smithsonian American Art Museum (Washington, D.C.)
Tate Gallery (London)
Toledo Museum of Art (Ohio)
United States Senate Art Collection
Virginia Museum of Fine Arts (Richmond)

Selected works

Gallery

See also
Art Students League of New York
Society of American Artists

References

Notes

Bibliography
 Armstrong, Craven, et al., 200 Years of American Sculpture, Whitney Museum of Art, NYC, 1976.
 Balfour, Graham, The Life of Robert Louis Stevenson, 12th ed. Metheun, London, 1913.
 
Clemen, Paul, in Die Kunst, Munich, 1910.
Cortissoz, Royal, Augustus Saint-Gaudens, New York, 1907.
 Craven, Wayne, Sculpture in America, Thomas Y. Crowell Co, NY, NY 1968.
Dryfhout, John H., Augustus Saint-Gaudens: The Portrait Reliefs, The National Portrait Gallery, Smithsonian Institution, Grossman Publishers, NY 1969.
Dryfhout, John H., The 1907 United States Gold Coinage, Eastern National Park & Monument Association 1996.
Dryfhout, John H., The Works of Augustus Saint-Gaudens, University Press of New England, Hanover 1982.

Saint - Gaudens, Zorn and the Goddesslike Miss Anderson by William E. Hagans - This article first appeared in the summer 2002 issue of American Art.  
Kvaran, Einar Einarsson, St. Gaudens' America, unpublished manuscript.
 McCullough, David. The Greater Journey: Americans in Paris. New York: Simon & Schuster. 2011.
Podas Larson, Christine, St. Gaudens' New York Eagle: Rescue And Restoration Of St. Paul's First Outdoor Sculpture, Ramsey County History Quarterly V37 #3, Ramsey County Historical Society, St Paul, MN, 2002.
Reynalds, Donald Martin, Masters of American Sculpture: The Figurative Tradition From the American Renaissance to the Millennium, Abbeville Press, NY 1993.
 C. Lewis Hind: Augustus Saint-Gaudens. Publisher: The International Studio, John Lane Company; New York 1908 - Internet Archive - online
 Augustus Saint-Gaudens - His Life: Chronology
 Augustus Saint-Gaudens - His Works: Chronology
 Photographic Reproductions of the Works of Augustus Saint-Gaudens
 Augustus Saint-Gaudens: The Reminiscences of Augustus Saint-Gaudens, Volume I. Edited and Amplified by Homer Saint-Gaudens, Published By The Century Co. New York, 1913 -Internet Archive - online
 The Reminiscences of Augustus Saint-Gaudens. Edited and amplified by Homer Saint-Gaudens. Volume Two. - Internet Archive - online
 Abraham Lincoln Monument. Landmark in the City of Chicago. - Internet Archive - online
 Taft, Lorado: The History of American Sculpture New York: Macmillan Company, London: Macmillan & Co., Ltd. 1903.
 Tharp, Louise Hall, Saint-Gaudens and the Gilded Era. Boston: Little, Brown & Co. 1969.
 Tolles, Thayer. "Augustus Saint-Gaudens (1848–1907)." In Heilbrunn Timeline of Art History. New York: The Metropolitan Museum of Art. October 2004.
 Tripp, David, "Fear and Trembling" & Other Discoveries: New Information on Augustus Saint-Gaudens and America's Most Beautiful Coin", ANS Magazine 6/1 (Winter 2007).
Wilkinson, Burke, and David Finn, photographs, Uncommon Clay: The Life and Works of Augustus Saint-Gaudens, Harcourt Brace Jovanovich, Publishers, San Diego. 1985.

External links

Saint-Gaudens National Historic Site
The Papers of Augustus Saint-Gaudens at Dartmouth College Library
Saint-Gaudens National Historic Site, New Hampshire
Saint-Gaudens National Historic Site: Home of a Gilded Age Icon, a National Park Service Teaching with Historic Places (TwHP) lesson plan
Major public works, illustrated
Saint-Gaudens twenty dollar gold coins
Saint-Gaudens Exhibit, American Numismatic Society

1848 births
1907 deaths
19th-century American sculptors
19th-century male artists
American male sculptors
Irish emigrants to the United States (before 1923)
Cooper Union alumni
National Academy of Design alumni
National Academy of Design members
People from County Dublin
Art Students League of New York faculty
Members of the American Academy of Arts and Letters
Deaths from cancer in New Hampshire
American alumni of the École des Beaux-Arts
American expatriates in France
Masterpiece Museum
Hall of Fame for Great Americans inductees
20th-century American sculptors
20th-century male artists
Honorary Members of the Royal Academy
Members of the Salmagundi Club
Sculptors from New York (state)
Artists of the Boston Public Library
American currency designers
Coin designers